Hunky may refer to:

 Hunky culture, American ethnic slur
 hunk or beefcake, male stereotype
 Hunky Shaw (1884-1969), American baseball player
 Hunky, from Hunky and Spunky

See also
 Hunky dory (disambiguation)
 Honky (disambiguation)